Muscari parviflorum is a species of plants in the family Asparagaceae.

Sources

References 

parviflorum
Flora of Malta